William Goggin (born 4 January 1941) is a former Australian rules footballer who played for the Geelong Football Club in the Victorian Football League (VFL). He later coached Geelong and also the Footscray Football Club.

Family
His brother Matt also played for Geelong, and other brother Charlie is a racehorse trainer in Tasmania.  Charlie's son Mathew Goggin, is a golfer on the PGA Tour.

Football
A member of the Australian Football Hall of Fame, Goggin was one of the VFL's finest rovers during his era, forming a memorable combination with legendary ruckman Polly Farmer and full forward Doug Wade. He was also a regular Big V representative, both as a player and coach.

On 6 July 1963 he was a member of the Geelong team that were comprehensively and unexpectedly beaten by Fitzroy, 9.13 (67) to 3.13 (31) in the 1963 Miracle Match.

Coach
After retiring from the VFL, Goggin coached Geelong West in the Victorian Football Association from 1972 until 1975. He led the club to the 1972 Division 2 premiership, a season in which the club was undefeated, and then to its first and only Division 1 premiership in 1975. He also played with the club in its 1972 premiership, and coached the club again to a Grand Final in 1979. He was also the coach of Victoria in State of Origin games on more than several occasions.

Goggin coached Geelong to successive Preliminary final appearances in 1980 and 1981, losing on both occasions to Collingwood in tight games. After Geelong only won seven games and crashed to ninth in 1982, Goggin contacted the club shortly after the end of the home-and-away rounds to say he would not seek reappointment as coach for the following season. He subsequently took up a board position at the club.

Australian Football Hall of Fame
He was inducted into the Australian Football Hall of Fame in 2000.  His citation read "Famous for roving to Graham "Polly" Farmer and pinpointing Doug Wade up forward."

Athletics
Goggin was also an accomplished sprinter, competing on the professional running circuit in the mid-1960s. He won the 1964 Ballarat Gift.

See also
 1963 Miracle Match

Footnotes

References
 "New Boys" join the 200 club, The Age, (Tuesday, 3 December 1968), p.25.

External links

AFL Hall of Fame - Players

Carji Greeves Medal winners
Geelong Football Club players
Geelong Football Club Premiership players
Geelong Football Club captains
Geelong Football Club coaches
Western Bulldogs coaches
Geelong West Football Club players
Geelong West Football Club coaches
North Geelong Football Club players
1941 births
Living people
Australian Football Hall of Fame inductees
Australian rules footballers from Geelong
One-time VFL/AFL Premiership players